Bechara "Charles" Khabouth is a Lebanese Canadian nightclub owner, restaurateur, music promoter, and hotelier. Controlling several Toronto-based hospitality properties and venues, he's been dubbed the "King of Clubs" due to his influence on the city's nightlife. In addition to Toronto, he also has venues in Niagara Falls, Montreal, and Miami Beach.

Khabouth manages his properties through INK Entertainment, a company he founded while opening nightclubs in the mid-1980s, his first ventures in the hospitality business. He initially made his name via Stilife, a ritzy nightclub for the posh crowd at the corner of Richmond Street West and Duncan Street in Toronto that ran from 1987 until 1995 triggering what eventually developed into the city's Entertainment District. Still, Khabouth is best known and widely lauded for his association with The Guvernment, a large 60,000-square foot nightclub complex he launched in 1996 and molded into a famous spot that successfully channeled the energy of the local rave scene during mid to late 1990s and later continued as the focal point of Toronto's electronic dance music scene.

Parallel to nightlife, almost immediately after establishing himself with clubs in the late 1980s, Khabouth also began launching upscale restaurants in Toronto, most of them as business partnerships either with local celebrity chefs or various Toronto restorateurs.

By early 2010s, Khabouth decided to enter the hotel aspect of the hospitality industry by announcing construction of Bisha Hotel & Residence, an upcoming 100-room boutique hotel on Blue Jays Way in downtown Toronto's Entertainment District set to open in spring 2016. In addition to the hotel part, Bisha is to contain around 300 condominium units thus taking advantage of the 2000s and 2010s condo boom in Toronto.

Since 2013, Khabouth has continually placed on Toronto Life'''s '50 Most Influential People in Toronto' annual list.

Early life
Khabouth was born in Beirut during early 1960s to father Antoine Khabouth who worked in hospitality and mother Margaret who took care of the household that in addition to young Charles consisted of his older brother and sister. Raised in privileged circumstances with staff in the house, each of the three siblings attended French Catholic private school. By 1970, after spending years managing a restaurant, his father raised enough funds to open his own supper club called Les Trois Tonneaux that went bankrupt after only six months. On his first night back working at the old restaurant, he suffered a heart attack at age 42 and died. Young Khabouth was only 9 years old at the time. His mother soon remarried, to William Nader, a successful Beirut accountant and close family friend.

In 1975, the outbreak of Lebanese Civil War made living conditions in Beirut unbearable as the family began sleeping in the parking garage beneath their building to stay safe during nightly bombings. Fifteen years of age by this point, young Khabouth began to be courted by the Christian militia. In August 1976, over a year into the conflict, teenage Khabouth got taken out of Lebanon by his stepfather and mother who altogether fled the country by paying to be smuggled to Cyprus in order to escape the war zone. The 14-hour boat ride took place on a fishing vessel carrying 300 people. Four days after reaching Cyprus, the family flew to Athens and then to Toronto where other family members had already settled.

Arriving to Canada, Khabouth enrolled at Overlea Secondary School in East York within Metropolitan Toronto. His penchant for working grueling hours soon emerged as he held three part-time jobs at one point during high school with his first job at a McDonald's while the other two were cleaning carpets and stocking shelves at an IGA store. After graduating, Khabouth took a job at a computer company, but he wanted work that involved dealing with people. Simultaneously, following a few nights out in Toronto, he began growing enamoured with the nightclub scene, quickly resolving to start putting money aside for a possible future attempt at running a nightclub. For the time being, he decided to give retail a try, finding a job at a Stitches store in Yorkville and quickly working his way up to manager there. Not even 20 years of age and looking to start his own business, he launched a clothing line, an entrepreneurial effort in Toronto that mostly consisted of getting the hip clothing stores that catered to the emerging Queen West scene interested in his products. However, realizing it would take years to build a name in fashion, he zeroed in on the nightclub business as his next area of interest.

Career in hospitality
Nightclubs
In 1984, twenty-two-year-old Khabouth bought a defunct gay club The Manatee at 11A St. Joseph Street in the Yonge & Wellesley area and after renovations opened Club Z. The entire project was financed with approximately C$30,000 that Khabouth secured by combining a few thousands of personal savings, a bank loan against his Audi car, and money borrowed from his stepfather. After buying the club for C$15,000, he earmarked the rest for the decor. Decorating the basement space modestly with, among other things, merchandise from Canadian Tire, he painted the floors himself and rented a sound system from Long & McQuade while in an effort to make the walls shiny he covered them with the metal sheeting used to make heating ducts. He looked to build regular crowds by catering to various social strata and musical tastes — the club's specialty nights included house music Saturdays (one of the first nightclubs in the city to play that type of music) and gay nights on Sundays for the population of the nearby Gay Village. Khabouth worked hard trying to ensure Club Z becomes a success, driving down to Detroit with his DJs during workweek in order to get the latest tunes for the weekend due to nonavailability of house music in Canadian record stores. Still, the first six months were a tough go and it wasn't long before Khabouth fell five months behind on his rent payments. Fortunately for Khabouth, liking the young man's drive, the landlord showed extreme patience. Desperately trying to generate some buzz for Club Z, Khabouth even turned to displaying snakes and cougars during club nights courtesy of a local service renting exotic animals for film work and photo shoots. Still, the club didn't really take off until an infamous Halloween weekend incident when a tiger that had been brought and displayed in the enclosure of the front window thinking it would attract clientele, broke a window after the club had closed for the night, prompting the arrival of police with rifles, the Toronto Humane Society, and local media. The coverage received in the printed press (the incident made the Toronto Star'' front page) and on television brought increased popularity to Club Z, eventually ensuring profitability for the venue that had been on the verge of financial collapse several times up to that point.

By 1986, with a more-or-less steady income from Club Z that for the most part attracted a younger and suburban crowd, Khabouth wanted to expand his patron base by tapping into the more mature and moneyed urban set. To that end he launched Stilife in October 1987 at the corner of Richmond West & Duncan in the almost deserted former Garment District of Toronto. With its aura of exclusivity, sexy vibe, including design and decor by the now globally renowned designers, Yabu Pushelberg, the club managed to strike the right note with the Bay Street and Rosedale crowd, becoming a big moneymaker for Khabouth. The club's success precipitated the arrival of many new clubs to the area whose real estate mostly lay empty since the early 1970s collapse of the city's garment industries. Additional clubs began arriving in the early 1990s, a trend that continued at such a rate that by mid-1990s the area, now officially renamed the Entertainment District also known as the Club District, had the highest concentration of nightclubs anywhere in North America.

By the time he decided to sell Stilife due to space constraints, 34-year-old Khabouth had already become well established as the Toronto 'King of Clubs'. His next move was taking over the huge RPM venue by Lake Ontario outside of the downtown core that also included the adjoining club called the Warehouse. Khabouth's original plan was to continue where he left off with Stilife, that is going after the posh, upscale crowd, but now on a significantly larger scale. He invested major funds into full renovation of the venues, complete with installing a new powerful sound system and a new name. The Guvernment opened in September 1996, however, due to the rave culture explosion in Toronto and the venue's huge space, rather than attracting the high-end crowd, it took off as a favourite spot of the rave kids. In addition to fostering local DJ talent such as deadmau5, Chris Sheppard (DJ), Mark Oliver, and Manzone & Strong as well as hosting big international electronic acts like Armin van Buuren, David Guetta, Sasha, Paul Oakenfold, Tiësto, Paul van Dyk, and Carl Cox, Khabouth's Guvernment, in its adjoining venue Kool Haus that could hold up to 2,500 people, also regularly hosted live band performances, starting with Marilyn Manson in October 1996 and followed by David Bowie's and INXS' respective back-to-back gigs during the same week in late September 1997 while the venue was still called the Warehouse. The fall 1997 name change to Kool Haus didn't disrupt the already established live concert practice so that touring acts continued playing the venue, including Bad Religion in March 2002, Garbage in April 2002 and April 2005, The Killers in December 2004 and October 2006, Nine Inch Nails on back-to-back nights in May 2005, Coldplay in May 2005, Oasis in June 2005, Usher in November 2008, Lady Gaga in June 2009, Arctic Monkeys in September 2009 and May 2011, 15-year-old Justin Bieber in November 2009, etc.

Restaurants
Immediately after his Stilife nightclub made a splash in the late 1980s, Khabouth began opening high-end restaurants in Toronto, seeking to transfer some of the upscale vibe from Stilife into the dining setting. However, especially when compared to his involvement with nightclubs, he's struggled for decades for similar recognition in the dining arena. Most of the criticism centers on the notion that his restaurants feel too much like nightclubs and are excessively flashy with too little substance i.e. exceptional food. Also, the fact that his late 1980s, 1990s, and 2000s eateries, some of them launched to major fanfare, only lasted a few years before either him pulling out of the venture or the venue altogether folding only further fueled the criticism.

Despite significant investment and high profile launches, it wouldn't be until his partnership with Hanif Harji, a collaboration that began in early 2010s yielding 9 active restaurants as of late 2015, that Khabouth's dining venues such as Patria and Byblos have gotten very enthusiastic reviews for their food primarily.

Personal
In 1998, Khabouth married Libby Eber whom he first met during early 1990s while she worked as a hostess in Acrobat, a restaurant he co-owned with Franco Prevedello. They had two kids, son Charlie and daughter Maya, before divorcing in mid 2000s.

References

Canadian restaurateurs
Lebanese emigrants to Canada
1960s births
Living people
Businesspeople from Beirut